Susan Soonkyu Lee (born May 15, 1989), known professionally as Sunny, is a Korean-American  singer and entertainer based in South Korea. She debuted as a member of girl group Girls' Generation (and later its subgroup Girls' Generation-Oh!GG) in August 2007, which went on to become one of the best-selling artists in South Korea and one of South Korea's most popular girl groups worldwide. Apart from her group's activities, Sunny has participated in numerous side projects including original soundtracks, television variety shows, musical acting and radio hosting.

Life and career

1989–2007: Early life and career beginnings
Sunny was born on May 15, 1989, in Orange County, California. Her family consists of her parents and two older sisters who are ten and fifteen years older than her. She and her sisters share the same birthday. Sunny's paternal uncle is Lee Soo-man, the founder of SM Entertainment. While she was still an infant, her family moved to Kuwait, then moved again shortly after to South Korea, during the time of the Gulf War. As a result of her brief war experience, Sunny grew up being scared of loud noises. She was influenced to become a singer by her father, who was in a college band. In 1998, Sunny joined SM Entertainment and became a trainee for five years. She transferred to Starworld agency, where her father worked as a manager, and was to debut in a duo group called Sugar. The group, however, never came to fruition. In early 2007, singer Ayumi Lee convinced Sunny to rejoin SM Entertainment. She continued her training there and made her official debut as a member of Girls' Generation in August 2007. The group gained significant popularity with the release of their hit single "Gee" in 2009.

2008–present: Acting and solo projects

Aside from Girls' Generation's activities, Sunny has participated in a number of side-projects. In early 2008, Sunny worked as a co-host of the Melon Chunji Radio with Super Junior's Sungmin. In August 2008, she contributed a solo song, "You Don't Know About Love" for the SBS's drama Working Mom. In 2009, Sunny released two songs—a solo track "Finally Now" for the interactive movie Story of Wine and a duet "It's Love" for the MBC's drama Heading to the Ground, with Girls' Generation's member Taeyeon. During 2009 and 2010, Sunny was a co-host for MTV Korea television music program The M with SS501's Kim Hyung-jun and 2AM's Im Seulong. She also joined the KBS2's variety show Invincible Youth along with Girls' Generation member Yuri. The reality program narrated a journey of a group of South Korean celebrities who were brought together to work and experience the agricultural and rural life. In March 2010, Sunny recorded "Your Doll" for the SBS's drama Oh! My Lady soundtrack—it became her first song to enter the Gaon Digital Chart, at number 88. During 2011 and 2012, she continued on with her participation in KBS2's Invincible Youth 2. She was praised by the director of the show as someone who has "intelligence", "great adaptability" and the ability to make other cast members get along well.

In January 2012, stepping into the field of voice-over for the first time, she was featured in the Korean-dubbed version of animated film The Outback. She voiced a koala character named Miranda. Sunny found the recording process to be initially difficult, stating that because Miranda was such a "charismatic" and "strong" character, it was hard to express "with just [her] voice" as it would have been "a different story if [she] was showing the actions". With the help of the director, however, she was able to finally "grasp the character". In March 2012, Sunny became a host for SBS MTV's television program Music Island. During the year, she also recorded two duets—the first song is titled "I Love You, I Love You", with Brown Eyed Girls' member Miryo while the other one is titled "It's Me", with f(x)'s Luna for the SBS's drama To The Beautiful You. The songs debuted at number 56 and 25 on the Gaon Digital Chart and at number 51 and 16 on Billboards K-pop Hot 100 chart, respectively.

During 2012–2013, Sunny was cast in her first musical, Catch Me If You Can, based on the true story and life of a con man named Frank Abagnale. The story was turned famous by the 2002 movie of the same name. She played a character named Brenda, who is the girlfriend of the male lead. Her performance received favorable reviews. Shin Yeong-seon from The Chosun Ilbo noted on Sunny's ability to understand the character and praised her well-portrayal of Brenda's "exaggerated cuteness and flippant acting". Jang Kyungjin of 10asia enjoyed her singing, "While Sunny wasn't a member in her group who put her vocals forth, she showed her power through Brenda's 'Fly, Fly Away' with her clean, firm voice, showing her potential to the audience." Sunny was nominated for the "Best New Actress" at the 6th Musical Awards. In June 2013, Sunny released the song "The 2nd Drawer" for the MBC's drama The Queen's Classroom. It debuted at number 76 on K-pop Top 100 Chart. In March 2014, Sunny participated in the Korean-dubbed version of the animated film Rio 2. She voiced Jewel, a female Spix's macaw. The director noted on her ability to not only deliver the lines, but also successfully expressed other sound effects, like breathing. In an interview, Sunny felt that the most appealing part of dubbing is the ability to go back to her childhood. In June 2014, Sunny was cast in her second musical, Singin' in the Rain, based on the 1952 movie of the same name. Sunny played Kathy Selden, an aspiring actress. In November 2014, her solo song, "First Kiss", was released as a part of musician Hwang Sung Je's Project Super Hero series.

Between 2014 and 2015, she became a cast member of the SBS's reality show Roommate. The show featured a group of celebrities living together, sharing the house as well as household tasks. During the same period, Sunny hosted the MBC radio show's FM Date. She contributed her own self-written logo song for the show and also won the "Rookie Radio DJ Award" at the year-end MBC Entertainment Awards. In April 2015, Sunny's voice was featured on indie-band Roof Top House's debut single "Heart Throbbing". The song managed to enter Gaon Digital Chart at number 89. In August-October 2015, she was a co-host for the short-lived JTBC's variety show Serial Shopping Family.

In March 2016, it was revealed that Sunny would be a celebrity judge in the new show, Vocal War: God's Voice. The purpose of the show is to create a one-on-one vocal battle between veteran singers in Korea and talented amateur vocalists. Starting from June 2016, Sunny joined the main cast of the JTBC variety show Cheonhajangsa (천하장사), a show featuring various traditional markets.

Discography

Filmography

Film

Television series

Television shows

Web shows

Radio shows

Musical theatre

Awards and nominations

Notes

References

External links

  
 

1989 births
Living people
Actresses from Orange County, California
American dance musicians
American expatriates in South Korea
American women pop singers
American musicians of Korean descent
American television hosts
English-language singers from South Korea
Girls' Generation members
Japanese-language singers of South Korea
Mandarin-language singers of South Korea
SM Entertainment artists
South Korean female idols
Radio personalities from California
21st-century American women singers
American women television presenters
21st-century American singers